The Tower of Álvar Fáñez (Spanish: Torreón de Álvar Fáñez) is a tower located in Guadalajara, Spain.  The medieval structure, formerly part of the city's defences, is named after Álvar Fáñez, "Conqueror of Guadalajara for Christianity".

It was declared Bien de Interés Cultural in 1921.

References 

Bien de Interés Cultural landmarks in the Province of Guadalajara
Towers in Spain